The first edition of the Bangladeshi music television series Coke Studio Bangla aired starting from 7 February to 1 September 2022. The season was produced by Shayan Chowdhury Arnob and distributed by Coca-Cola Bangladesh.

Featured Artists 

 Animes Roy
 Armeen Musa
 Bappa Mazumder
 Dilshad Nahar Kona
 Jalali Set (Band)
 Jannatul Firdous Akbar
 Kaniz Khandaker Mitu
 Karishma Shanu Sovvota
 Madhubanti Bagchi
 Masha Islam
 Md. Makhon Mia
 Mizan Rahman
 Momtaz Begum
 Nigar Sumi
 Pantha Kanai
 Ripon Kumar Sarkar (Boga)
 Rituraj Baidya
 Rubayat Rehman
 Samina Chowdhury
 Sanzida Mahmood Nandita
 Shayan Chowdhury Arnob
 Sinha Hasan
 Soumyadeep Murshidabadi
 Sunidhi Nayak
 Tahsan Rahman Khan
 Tasfia Fatima (Tashfi)
 Tashbiha Binte Shahid Mila
 Warda Ashraf
 Zohad Reza Chowdhury

Production 
Speaking at the launch of Coke Studio Bangla Season 1, Shayan Chowdhury Arnob said,

Episodes 
All songs were produced by Shayan Chowdhury Arnob.

Notes and references

Notes

References 

Bangladeshi music television shows
Musical television series